Callionymus valenciennei, Valenciennes’ dragonet, is a species of dragonet native to the Pacific waters around Japan and the Korean Peninsula where it occurs at depths of from .  This species grows to a length of  SL. The specific name and the vernacular name honour the French zoologist Achille Valenciennes (1794-1865).

References 

V
Fish described in 1845